Lieutenant General Sir Christopher Linley Tickell,  (born 17 March 1964) is a senior British Army officer who served as the Deputy Chief of the General Staff from August 2019 to August 2022.

Early life and education
Tickell was born on 17 March 1964 in Epsom, Surrey, England. He was educated at Wellington College, Berkshire, a private school, and at Cranfield University.

Military career
Tickell was commissioned into the Royal Engineers in December 1983. After deployments as a squadron commander in Bosnia and Kosovo, he became commanding officer of 23 Engineer Regiment (Air Assault) in 2003 and in that role took part in the invasion of Iraq. He went on to be a staff officer in the Directorate of Training in May 2005 and commander of 8 Force Engineer Brigade in November 2007 and in that role was deployed to Afghanistan.

He became Director of the Army Division at the Joint Services Command and Staff College in December 2009, Director-General of the Army Recruiting and Training Division in August 2013, and Director Capability in November 2016. Tickell was promoted to lieutenant general on 12 August 2019 and assumed the duties of Deputy Chief of the General Staff that same date. He stepped down from this position in August 2022, and retired from the army on 27 December 2022.

He was appointed Knight Commander of the Order of the British Empire (KBE) in the 2021 Birthday Honours.

References

|-

British Army generals
British Army personnel of the Iraq War
British Army personnel of the War in Afghanistan (2001–2021)
Knights Commander of the Order of the British Empire
Living people
Royal Engineers officers
1964 births
People educated at Wellington College, Berkshire
Alumni of Cranfield University
Military personnel from Surrey